The Uere River, also spelled Were River is a river in the Democratic Republic of the Congo. It originates near the border with Sudan and flows west to join the Uele River.

References

Rivers of the Democratic Republic of the Congo
Uele River